Michael Gianaris (born April 23, 1970) is an American politician and attorney from Queens, New York. He represents New York's 12th State Senate district, which includes the Queens neighborhoods of Astoria, Long Island City, Sunnyside and parts of Woodside, Maspeth, Ridgewood and Woodhaven. He is the second Greek-American to be elected to the New York State Legislature after Dean Skelos. Since 2019, he has served as the Deputy Majority Leader, the second-highest ranking member of the Senate.

Life and education
Gianaris was born in Astoria and is the son of Greek immigrants, Nicholas and Magdalene Gianaris. He graduated from New York City (NYC) public schools P.S. 84, Junior High School 141 and Long Island City High School. He received a B.A. summa cum laude in economics and political science from Fordham University and earned a J.D. degree from Harvard Law School.

In 2000, he was elected to the New York State Assembly. Gianaris had previously served as Associate Counsel to the Committee on Consumer Affairs and Protection, Governmental Operations, Veterans Affairs, and Agriculture and Markets of the Assembly, and also served as an aide to former Queens Congressman Thomas Manton, an aide to former Governor Mario Cuomo's Queens County Regional Representative, and as a member of Queens Community Planning Board 1 and Legal Counsel to the United Community Civic Association.

In September 2007, he was named one of City Hall's "40 under 40" for being a young influential member of NYC politics. He is divorced and resides in Astoria.

New York State Senate
In 2010, Senator George Onorato decided not to seek re-election, and Gianaris was nominated to replace him. In a strongly Democratic district, Gianaris was elected easily, and has never faced a serious re-election.

In 2018, Gianaris was seen as the architect in helping to eliminate the Independent Democratic Conference and in creating a roadmap for Democrats to take the majority in the state Senate, which was successful. Following their ascent to the majority, Gianaris was named Deputy Majority Leader.

Gianaris supports bail reform and elimination of cash bail. He has introduced a bill which would give judges three options in lieu of cash bail: release on recognizance, conditional monitored release, or remand to a correctional facility.

Gianaris introduced legislation to automatically register eligible voters otherwise interacting with state government, something which is already implemented in 14 states and Washington, D.C., including in states such as California, Alaska, and West Virginia. He also has proposed allowing "eligible voters to register and cast a ballot on Election Day". It would require amending the state constitution.

Gianaris was the principal figure in the cancelling of Amazon's HQ2 in NYC. Gianaris has been noted for his support for antitrust enforcement, having introduced the "21st Century Antitrust Act" in the New York State Legislature and written in support of the federal American Innovation and Choice Online Act proposal.

References

External links
New York State Senate Member Website
Biography: New York State Democratic Committee
Greek News - Michael Gianaris Quits Race for Attorney General
Queens Assemblyman Goes After Google
Mike Gianaris Calls on DMV to Reinstitute Greek Language Tests

1970 births
Living people
Democratic Party members of the New York State Assembly
Democratic Party New York (state) state senators
Fordham University alumni
Harvard Law School alumni
American people of Greek descent
21st-century American politicians
People from Astoria, Queens